Gene Roebuck (born February 8, 1947) is the retired head coach of the women's basketball team at the University of North Dakota. He is a graduate of Mayville State University.

See also
List of college women's basketball coaches with 600 wins

References

Place of birth missing (living people)
1947 births
Living people
American women's basketball coaches
North Dakota Fighting Hawks baseball coaches
North Dakota Fighting Hawks women's basketball coaches
Mayville State University alumni